Douglas Paul George (born November 5, 1960) is an American professional stock car racing driver and mechanic. He currently serves as the crew chief of the No. 9 CR7 Motorsports Chevrolet Silverado driven by Colby Howard in the NASCAR Craftsman Truck Series.

Racing career
He began racing professionally in the 1980s, driving for his own team. In 1990, he won the NASCAR Featherlite Southwest Series Rookie of the Year award. He later moved to the NASCAR Winston West Series, where he won Rookie of the Year honors and later, the 1995 series championship.

George made his NASCAR debut in 1995 at Sears Point International Raceway. Driving the No. 07 Olson Technology Ford Thunderbird, he qualified 42nd and finished 31st in the Winston Cup race. He ran an additional race that season at Phoenix International Raceway, where he finished 41st after a wreck. In 1996, he ran the Craftsman Truck Series in the No. 21 Ortho Ford F-150. He had a fifth-place run at Sears Point, and finished 12th in the standings, runner-up to Bryan Reffner in the Rookie of the Year battle.

In 1997, George began driving the No. 12 Chevrolet Silverado for Bob Blake. He drove for a variety of teams that season, his best finish an eighth at Sonoma for Charles Hardy. He began the 1998 in the No. 26 MB Motorsports Ford, posting two thirtieth-place finishes. Late in the season, he joined Liberty Racing, driving the No. 84 Porter-Cable Power Tools Ford and had a tenth at Sonoma, before finishing the season in Liberty's No. 98 Big Daddy's BBQ Sauce Ford, where he had his worst finish with Liberty, fifteenth.

In 1999, George drove a pair of races for Conely Racing, finishing seventeenth at Gateway International Raceway. He joined Impact Motorsports as the crew chief of the No. 12 Hot Wheels Dodge Ram for Carlos Contreras in 2000. During the season, he drove Impact's No. 86 R.C. Cola truck at Gateway following the release of Mike Cope, finishing 33rd after a wreck. He drove the No. 12 truck filling in for Contreras at Kentucky, finishing sixteenth.

In 2009, George was inducted into the West Coast Stock Car Hall of Fame.

Crew chiefing career
Following his driving career, George worked at Morgan-Dollar Motorsports, and later at Joe Gibbs Racing, serving as crew chief for Coy Gibbs. In 2005, he joined Xpress Motorsports and was named crew chief for the No. 19 for Regan Smith, but the team shut down after two races. He joined the No. 89 team driven by Morgan Shepherd in 2006 before the team was purchased by CJM Racing. In 2007, he returned to NASCAR as crew chief for Billy Ballew Motorsports from 2008 to 2010, working most notably with Kyle Busch. He left BBM for Kevin Harvick Incorporated in 2010 to crew chief the No. 2 truck split by Kevin Harvick and Elliott Sadler. He moved to the No. 32 Turner Motorsports team in 2011 but then left for Jason White's GB Racing team for the 2012 season. After White shut down his truck team and moved to the Nationwide Series in 2013, he served as the crew chief for rookie Gray Gaulding at NTS Motorsports in the NASCAR K&N Pro Series East. However, in September, he went back to the Truck Series crew chiefing for Dakoda Armstrong at Turn One Racing.

George returned to the K&N Series in 2014, starting the year as crew chief for Australian Brodie Kostecki's family team. After a few races, he left to return to Turner Scott Motorsports as Ron Hornaday's crew chief. When Hornaday's No. 30 team shut down in August due to lack of sponsorship, he was named crew chief for teammate Ben Kennedy's No. 31 truck, replacing Michael Shelton, who went to become the first crew chief for John Wes Townley's new team, Athenian Motorsports.

TSM closed down their truck team in 2015 and George moved to the No. 98 ThorSport Racing truck as Johnny Sauter's crew chief for the entire season. Although the team didn't win any races that year, they still finished 4th in points. Sauter left for GMS Racing in 2016, and was replaced by Rico Abreu. George remained the crew chief, but was released with a few races left in the season after the team was winless again and missed the playoffs. He was picked up by Hattori Racing Enterprises, becoming Ryan Truex's crew chief. Hattori replaced him with Scott Zipadelli in 2017, and he went to MB Motorsports to crew chief the No. 63 truck for the Donahue brothers (Kyle and Kevin) and a rotation of other drivers. He then joined BK Racing as crew chief for Corey LaJoie and the No. 83 Cup Series team, replacing Doug Richert, the team's competition director who was serving temporarily as crew chief to start the year on top of that. Later in the year, BK mostly cut back to one car due to sponsorship and financial issues with the team's owner, leaving George without a team again.

In 2018, he joined the new All Out Motorsports team as crew chief for Korbin Forrister part time. He began the 2019 season without a crew chiefing job (Wally Rogers replaced him at AOM), but soon after the start of the season, he briefly became the crew chief for the No. 44 truck of Niece Motorsports, later moving to Codie Rohrbaugh's No. 9 team, (ironically for the second time) replacing Michael Shelton after he went to Kyle Busch Motorsports. The team attempted most of the season in 2020 with Rohrbaugh and 2021 with Rohrbaugh and Grant Enfinger. In 2022, Blaine Perkins became the full-time driver of the No. 9 and the team ran a full season for the first time.

Motorsports career results

NASCAR
(key) (Bold - Pole position awarded by qualifying time. Italics - Pole position earned by points standings. * – Most laps led.)

Winston Cup Series

Craftsman Truck Series

Winston West Series

References

External links
 
 

Living people
1960 births
People from Atwater, California
Racing drivers from California
NASCAR drivers
NASCAR crew chiefs